Brave Pigeon (Spanish: Paloma brava) is a 1961 Mexican film directed by Rogelio A. González with Rosita Quintana, Miguel Aceves Mejía and Sara García.

It was one of three ranchera comedies that year by González based on screenplays by Janet Alcoriza (formerly Raquel Rojas) and Fernando Galiana. The other two were El buena suerte, also with Aceves Mejía, and El jinete negro, a western parody with an early appearance by Mauricio Garcés.

Cast 
 Rosita Quintana as Marta/Laura
 Miguel Aceves Mejía as Gabino Morones
 Sara García as Doña Popotita
 Roberto Ramírez Garza as Chava
 Alfredo Varela Jr. as Doctor (as Varelita)
 Guillermo Hernández as Polo Lobo (as Lobo Negro)
 Manuel Vergara Manver as the superintendent Don Nabor
 José Chávez as Hermano Lobo
 Sergio Llanes
 Victorio Blanco as old cancionero
 Felipe del Castillo as Chava's patient

References

External links 
 

Films directed by Rogelio A. González
1961 films
Mexican comedy films
1960s Mexican films